The 2009 Riga riot was an outbreak of civil unrest in Riga, Latvia, on January 13, 2009, lasting for three hours following the economic downturn of the 2008 Latvian financial crisis as well as political discontent with the Latvian government's continued pursuance of austerity policies. Around 10,000 people gathered for anti-government protests which eventually became violent. The riot was  the worst outbreak of violence in Latvia since 1991 when Latvia declared independence from the Soviet Union.

Background 
Before the riot, the All for Latvia party organized a rally demanding that the President of Latvia dissolve the Saeima as well as call early elections. Protesters were concerned mainly with the competence of their political administration, corruption and the economic downturn caused by the 2008 Latvian financial crisis. The financial crisis resulted in a recession and an unemployment crisis after Latvia had been the fastest growing economy in Europe for several consecutive years.

Riot 
After the crowd had become violent, some attempted to storm the Saeima but were repulsed by riot police with Mace, truncheons and tear gas. After the failed attempt at storming the parliament, ice, rocks and other debris were thrown at government buildings as well as police. After the rioters had been dispersed by police they regrouped at Vecrīga where the smashing of windows as well as the looting of shops began.

Aftermath 
Following the riot, 126 people were arrested and at least 25 injured, although these numbers are disputed. On February 20, the cabinet of prime minister Ivars Godmanis was dissolved and he resigned his position as head of the government. Similar protests took place in Vilnius, Lithuania, three days after the protest in Riga, these protests also ending in similar riots.

The Social Democratic Party "Harmony" gained considerable popularity after the riots.

See also
 2008 Greek riots
 Financial crisis of 2007–2008
 Credit Crunch

References

Riga riot
Riga riot
Political riots
Political history of Latvia